The Golden Years is a 1960 American sponsored film promoting bowling as a family sport. It features a populuxe bowling alley with a family of four having fun. It is a notable populuxe film. It was made by the Jam Handy Organization. It is in the public domain.

This short, along with many others considered to be time-capsule chronicles of their period, has been frequently classified as camp and shown as filler within Turner Classic Movies' Saturday night–Sunday morning film showcase series, TCM Underground.

Plot summary

Promotional film which demonstrates Brunswick Gold Crown line of bowling alley recreational seats, ball returns, foul buzzers, subway returns and inline units, hand dryers, power lifts and overhead projectors, classic beauty and twin line masking units and automatic pinsetter machines.

Cast

See also
 Populuxe
 Sponsored film
 Bowling

References

External links
 The Golden Years for free legal download
 
 

1960 films
1960 short films
Jam Handy Organization films
Ten-pin bowling films
Sponsored films
American short films
1960s sports films
Promotional films
1960s English-language films